This is a list of museums in Piedmont, Italy.

References

Piedmont